The Arboretum et parc de la Rigolée is an arboretum and town park located on the Avenue des Isles in Avermes, Allier, Auvergne, France. It is open daily without charge.

See also 
 List of botanical gardens in France

References 
 Allier, Petit Futé, 2005, page 71. .
 Allier Tourism entry (French)
 AZ Louisirs entry (French)

Gardens in Allier
Rigolée